Evil Genius is the twelfth studio album by American rapper Gucci Mane. It was released on December 7, 2018, by Atlantic Records and GUWOP Enterprises. The album features guest appearances from Quavo, 21 Savage, YoungBoy Never Broke Again, Kevin Gates, Bruno Mars, Kodak Black, Migos, Lil Yachty, Lil Skies, and Lil Pump, while the production was handled by Southside, Metro Boomin, Murda Beatz, Honorable C.N.O.T.E. and OG Parker, among others.

The album is supported by three singles: "Solitaire" featuring Migos and Lil Yachty, "Kept Back" featuring Lil Pump, and "Wake Up in the Sky" with Bruno Mars and Kodak Black. The album went gold on June 24, 2021

Background
Less than a week after releasing his mixtape El Gato: The Human Glacier, Gucci Mane announced his next studio album titled "The Evil Genius".

During an interview with Billboard, Gucci Mane spoke about the progress of album:

In an interview with Zane Lowe, Gucci Mane revealed production from Metro Boomin, Southside, and Honorable C.N.O.T.E. and guest appearances from Offset, Quavo, 21 Savage, Kevin Gates and YoungBoy Never Broke Again.

On November 6, 2018, the album's release date was announced, alongside the revealing of the tracklist.

On November 27, 2018, the cover art was revealed via Instagram, with a short album teaser on Twitter.

Promotion
The album's lead single, "Solitaire" featuring Migos and Lil Yachty, was released on March 2, 2018. The music video was released on May 22, 2018.

Followed by the second single, bonus track "Kept Back" featuring Lil Pump was released on August 9, 2018. The official music video was released on October 17, 2018 for Mane’s “National 1017 Day” to celebrate the day in 2017 he married Jamaican model Keyshia Ka'oir. 

The third single "Wake Up in the Sky" with Bruno Mars and Kodak Black was released on September 14, 2018. The music video was released on October 31, 2018. The single is tied for Gucci Mane's highest charting single to date, peaking at number 11 on the Billboard Hot 100. It is also his highest performing single on radio.

"I'm Not Goin'" featuring Kevin Gates, was released as the first promotional single on November 15, 2018, along with the music video.

"Bipolar" featuring Quavo, was released as the second promotional single on November 30, 2018.

Critical reception

Evil Genius received generally positive reviews from critics. Evan Rytlewski of Pitchfork generally praised the album, giving it a 6.5 out of 10, but noted that although "it's one of his most considered and carefully curated projects, Gucci plays it uncharacteristically safe for most of it." Aaron Williams of Uproxx praised Gucci's effort, saying that "On his latest project, Gucci Mane may not break much new ground, but he's reached the point in his career where he doesn't really need to, because he already has."

Commercial performance
Evil Genius debuted at number five on the US Billboard 200 chart, earning 51,000 album-equivalent units (with 5,000 in traditional album sales) in its first week, becoming Gucci Mane's fifth top-ten album on the chart.

Track listing
Credits adapted from Tidal.

Personnel
Credits adapted from Tidal.

 Eddie "eMIX" Hernandez – mixing 
 Serban Ghenea – mixing 
 Kori Anders – mixing 
 Colin Leonard – mastering

Charts

Weekly charts

Year-end charts

Certifications

References

2018 albums
Gucci Mane albums
Atlantic Records albums
Albums produced by Bruno Mars
Albums produced by Cubeatz
Albums produced by Honorable C.N.O.T.E.
Albums produced by Metro Boomin
Albums produced by Murda Beatz
Albums produced by Southside (record producer)